Top Album Sales is a music chart published by Billboard magazine starting in December 2014. It is a weekly chart documenting the best-selling albums on a weekly basis in the United States. Up until December 2014, this had been documented by the Billboard 200 chart, but that chart was altered to factor in music streaming by accounting for album-equivalent units in its tallies to document the effect of the rise of music streaming outlets such as Apple Music and Spotify. The Top Album Sales chart was created to preserve the older methodology of counting pure album sales.

List of number ones

References

Billboard charts